Lê Đức Lương (born 18 August 1994) is a Vietnamese footballer who plays as a left-back for V.League 1 club Hoàng Anh Gia Lai

Honours
Hồ Chí Minh City
Vietnamese Super Cup: Runner-up: 2020

External links

References 

1994 births
Living people
Vietnamese footballers
Association football fullbacks
V.League 1 players
Hoang Anh Gia Lai FC players
Ho Chi Minh City FC players
People from Bình Dương Province